Ghick is a clan found in Jats and Rajput both ethnicities. It is also written as Ghik. In Punjab it is pronounced "Ke'k" more commonly. They are found in both Indian and Pakistani Punjabs, particularly in Montgomery Region where they hold major political impact on wide scope. Gujranwala Region is next to it followed by Lyallpur Region. In India, districts of Jalandhar and Firozpur are worth mentioning

Main occupation is agriculture.

References 

Dogra